Rybka (Belarusian and Russian Рыбка; Czech/Slovak feminine: Rybková) is a surname meaning "little fish" in Belarusian, Czech, Polish, Russian, Slovak, and Ukrainian. Notable people with the surname include:
 Anastasia Rybka (born 1993), Ukrainian-American table tennis player
 Eugeniusz Rybka (1898–1988), Polish astronomer
 Kurt Rybka, German commander in the 1944 Operation Rösselsprung
 Oleksandr Rybka (born 1987), Ukrainian footballer

See also
 
 Rybak
 Ryba

Belarusian-language surnames
Czech-language surnames
Polish-language surnames
Slovak-language surnames
Ukrainian-language surnames